Vermicularia knorrii, common name Florida worm snail, is a species of sea snail, a marine gastropod mollusk in the family Turritellidae.

Description 
The shell of this species can reaches a length of 20 – 80 mm. When the shell is intact, the apex is pure white, somewhat translucent, and tightly coiled into a "Turritella" shape. However, the subsequent whorls are brown, and they are loosely and irregular coiled, such that the whorls do not touch.

Distribution
This species is found in the Caribbean Sea and the Gulf of Mexico (being known from the Yucatan, Florida, Bermuda, Cuba, Jamaica, and Puerto Rico.)

Habitat 
The minimum recorded depth for this species is 2 m; the maximum recorded depth is 110 m.

References

External links
 
 Jaxshell

Turritellidae
Gastropods described in 1843